{{Infobox animanga/Print
| type            = manga
| author          = Ai Morinaga
| publisher       = Enix (Chapters 1–5), Mag Garden
| publisher_en    = 
| demographic     = Shōjo
| magazine        = Monthly Stencil (Chapters 1–5)Monthly Comic Blade (Chapters 6–33)Monthly Comic Avarus (Chapters 34–62)'
| first           = January 2001
| last            = August 2011
| volumes         = 8
| volume_list     = 
The series was first published in Enix's Monthly Stencil in January 2001, was later obtained by Mag Garden who published it in Monthly Comic Blade then Monthly Comic Avarus where it concluded its serialization in August 2011. The individual chapters were collected and released into eight tankōbon volumes by Mag Garden. In Japan, Boku to Kanojo no Peke Mittsu has been adapted into three radio dramas and a live action film. Your and My Secret follows the effeminate Akira Uehara who switches bodies with the tomboy Nanako Momoi due to an accident.

ADV Manga licensed Boku to Kanojo no Peke Mittsu and released it under the name Your and My Secret in 2004. Tokyopop later obtained the license and released the first seven volumes of Your and My Secret. After Tokyopop's closure in 2011, the North American licensing was returned to Mag Garden. In 2012, JManga licensed and published the eight volumes digitally. The series has also been popularized under the name My Barbaric Girlfriend due to scanlations. Tokyopop's localized volumes appeared on ICv2's monthly top 300-selling graphic novels. English reviewers have praised the series' humor with mixed reaction to the plot and characters.

Plot
Akira Uehara volunteers to deliver homework to Nanako Momoi, his classmate and crush. At Nanako's home, her grandfather's invention causes Akira and Nanako to exchange bodies; the invention is destroyed shortly after its use. Nanako is thrilled with the exchange as it complements her tomboy personality; she begins dating her friend Makoto Shiina. Meanwhile, Akira's effeminate personality combined with Nanako's beauty garners the courtship of his friend, Shinnosuke Senbongi, to his discomfort.

The series continues episodically and focuses on Akira's deteriorating resolve to return to his body and his hesitation in reconciling Shinnosuke's feelings. Eventually, Akira decides to accept the new status quo but a new invention unintentionally reverses the exchange; the invention is destroyed after its use once again and Nanako's grandfather becomes amnesiac. On the behest of Akira and the friends, Shinnosuke begins researching on how to build a machine to reenact the exchange. Eight years later, Shinnosuke succeeds allowing the four to reunite with their respective lovers.

Main characters

Akira is an effeminate male with a crush Nanako Momoi. After exchanging bodies with her, his personality and Nanako's feminine appearance causes his popularity to soar. His best friend, Shinnosuke Senbongi, learns his secret and becomes enamored with his new appearance. Initially, Akira was adamant on returning to his body and maintaining his masculinity. During the series, he reluctantly reconciles Shinnosuke's feelings and upon realizing everyone is happier with the new status quo, resigns to live in Nanako's body. He is voiced by Kenji Nojima in the three radio dramas and is portrayed by Shun Shioya in the live action film.

Nanako is an extreme tomboy with an insensitive personality. Like Akira Uehara, she becomes popular with the students and Akira's parents after the exchange due to her personality and Akira's masculine appearance. Initially Nanako intended to return to her body after having fun as a male and was very strict on how Akira treated her body. She resolves to stay in Akira's body and relents her body's ownership to Akira after she falls completely in love with her friend, Makoto Shiina. Her parents learn about the exchange and are supportive of the status quo as they accept Nanako's hopelessness as a female. She is voiced by Miyuki Sawashiro in the three radio dramas and is portrayed by Mai Takahashi in the live action film.

Sebongi is Akira Uehara's childhood friend. He falls for Akira, in Nanako's body, and wholly accepts the body exchange. Shinnosuke uses his wits in order to make Akira acknowledge his growing attraction towards him. He is voiced by Kōsuke Toriumi in the three radio drama and is portrayed by Taigo Fujisawa in the live action film.

Makoto is a good matured girl who is Nanako Momoi's friend. She is unaware of the exchange and begins dating Nanako, in Akira's body, while maintaining her friendship with Akira, in Nanako's body. Her brother, is overprotective of her and threatens any males who comes close to her. She is voiced by Rie Kugimiya in the three radio dramas and is portrayed by Akie Suzuki in the live action film.

Manzou is Nanako Momoi's grandfather. He is overweight, lazy, perverted, and fails as an inventor. After the exchange, he refuses to rebuild the machine as he is happier having a feminine granddaughter who does the house chores. In the second accident which undoes Akira and Nanako's exchange, he becomes amnesiac from a head injury. He is voiced by Kenichi Ogata in the three radio dramas and is portrayed by Masahiro Sato in the live action film.Credits from 

ReleaseMy and Her Three X's is written and illustrated by Ai Morinaga. It began serialization in Enix's Monthly Stencil magazine in its March 2001 issue and published five chapters in total upon the November 2001 issue's release. Afterwards, its serialization was resumed in Mag Garden's Monthly Comic Blades first issue, April 2002, and published the thirty-third chapter in the October 2007 issue. Its serialization was transferred to Mag Garden's Monthly Comic Avarus beginning in the November 2007 issue where the final chapter was published in the September 2011 issue. Concurrent to the serialization, Ai Morinaga created side stories which were published in Comic Blade Masamune 2003 Summer Edition and Comic Blade Zebel issues 2 to 6. Mag Garden collected the individual chapters and side stories into eight tankōbon volumes which were released between December 10, 2002 and October 15, 2011. Extra-Part was published in Mag Garden's online magazine, Web Comic Beat's, between June 25, 2012 and March 25, 2013. The chapters were later released in a tankōbon on May 14, 2013. Morinaga commented the serialization kept her indoors most of the time and limited her contact with people to her assistant, publisher, supermarket cashiers, and delivery boys.

ADV Manga licensed the series as Your and My Secret for North America and released the first volume on July 6, 2004. Tokyopop later acquired the license and released the first seven volumes between March 11, 2008 and November 30, 2010. After Tokyopop's North American division was closed down, the North American license were returned to Mag Garden. In 2012, JManga licensed the series for digital release in English; the eight volumes were made available between May 3, 2012 and August 23, 2012. The manga has also been localized in other languages such as Germany, Italian, Chinese, Thai, Vietnamese, and Spanish. Scanlations of the Chinese translations popularized the series under the name My Barbaric Girlfriend.

Volume list

Radio drama
Three radio dramas based on the manga series were produced. The first radio drama was available for order in Monthly Comic Blade''s August 2005 issue and is a reenactment of the first five chapters in the series. The second drama was included with the limited edition of the eighth volume. It is a reenactment of chapters 29–32. The third drama was released with the limited edition of the extra volume. It reenacts the first three chapters in the extra volume.

Film adaptation
A live action film based on the manga was released direct to DVD on April 21, 2006 by Sega. It is directed by Masaki Hamamoto with screenplay by Mikio Satake.  is a guide book which provides background production information on the film. It was released before the film on September 28, 2005. The plot begins similarity to the manga and Akira and Nanako exchange bodies. Manzou gives the two a deadline to raise money in order to rebuild the machine. Akira succeeds but is forced to pay off Nanako's incurring debt. The deadline passes and Manzou leaves Japan, concluding with Akira and Nanako promising to earn enough money for when Manzou returns.

Reception
Tokyopop's localized volumes appeared on ICv2's monthly top 300-selling graphic novels. About.com readers ranked the series third as Best New Shojo Manga in 2008 and was ranked in the 10 Bizarre Shojo Manga Love Stories in 2010. Jason Thompson praised the series for being smart, funny, and unpredictable. Pop Culture Shock.com agreed on the humor, and described the series as something all Shōjo fans will enjoy. Mania.com described the first volume as an enjoyable read, praised it for the humor and its interesting and realistic approach to the gender swap topic, but expressed annoyance with the protagonist's behavior. Meanwhile, IGN panned the plot for being preposterous, citing the protagonists' personalities to be too extreme, and gave no incentive to move past the first volume.

Notes and references
Notes

References

Primary references

External links

Ai Morinaga
ADV Manga
IG Port franchises
Mag Garden manga
Romantic comedy anime and manga
Shōjo manga
Tokyopop titles
Transgender in anime and manga